Gyromantis kraussi, the spiny bark mantis,  is a member of the mantis family. It is native to Australia.

Its name is inspired by the spines on its head and abdomen. The insect is also popularly known as a "bark runner," in reference to its response when startled.

Although many species of mantis are kept as pets, Gyromantis kraussi is less common due to its natural food sources, such as stink bugs, being difficult to provide.

References

Mantodea of Oceania
Insects of Australia
Endemic fauna of Australia
Nanomantidae
Insects described in 1872